"Don't Answer Me" is a 1984 song by the Alan Parsons Project from the album Ammonia Avenue. It reached number 15 on the Billboard charts in the United States and was the final Billboard Top 20 hit for the group. It also reached number 58 in the United Kingdom, the group's highest chart placing in their native country. The music video was rendered in comic book style, with art and animation by Michael Kaluta.

The song
Instead of the art rock and progressive rock sounds for which Alan Parsons was well-known, Parsons crafted "Don't Answer Me" in the style of Phil Spector and his Wall of Sound technique.  Eric Woolfson, the co-writer, handled lead vocals on the single, with Mel Collins providing a saxophone solo with a "soothing yet destitute wail".

Music video
The music video was filmed at the Broadcast Arts animation studio, with Kaluta acting as lead designer and animator from a script by D.J. Webster.  The video took 23 days to film, using a 40-man animation team, and combined traditional cel animation (in the rendering of the figures), stop-motion animation (for the majority of the movements), and even claymation.  The final cost topped $50,000.

The video is presented as a story in the fictional comic book series, The Adventures of Nick and Sugar, set in 1930s Florida.  The story starts at the Flamingo Bar, where Sugar is on a date with the thuggish "Muscles" Malone.  Sugar was once Nick's girl, and Nick drinks heavily (emptying a bottle of Johnnie Walker Red) as he watches Malone manhandle Sugar.  After finishing the bottle, Nick leaves the bar and drives to the Burgers'N'Shakes drive-in, passing a billboard with the Ammonia Avenue album cover displayed.  While admitting his heartbreak to Leslie, the carhop, a black sedan carrying Malone and Sugar pulls up next to Nick's convertible.  When Sugar resists Malone's demand for a kiss, Malone moves to slap Sugar.  An enraged Nick pulls Malone from his car and starts brawling with the much-larger thug.  Malone appears to have beaten Nick, but Nick summons one last powerful uppercut and knocks Malone clear off the planet, sending him into the left eye of the Man in the Moon.  Nick and Sugar embrace, deeply in love; as they embrace, the view quickly cuts to a still picture drawing of the band featuring Woolfson and Parsons at keyboards, dressed in 1930s cocktail lounge outfits, performing the song.  Nick and Sugar drive away together, with Nick pausing to wipe Malone out of the Man in the Moon's eye with his handkerchief.

The video was nominated for Most Experimental Video at the first-ever 1984 MTV Video Music Awards, but lost to Herbie Hancock's "Rockit".

The video became well-known in Ireland (though the song did not chart) through weekly airings on the Sunday afternoon MT USA show hosted from New York by Vincent Hanley.

Live recordings
Parsons and his "Alan Parsons Live Project" band perform the song in concert, with live versions released on the albums Alan Parsons Live with Gary Howard and Chris Thompson on vocals, Eye 2 Eye: Live In Madrid, and Alan Parsons Symphonic Project, Live in Colombia, the latter two with Parsons on lead vocals.

Chart performance

Weekly charts

Year-end charts

Personnel
Ian Bairnson: acoustic and electric guitars
Colin Blunstone: vocals
Mel Collins: saxophone
Stuart Elliott: drums, percussion
Alan Parsons: production, Fairlight programming, engineering
David Paton: bass
Chris Rainbow: vocals
Eric Woolfson: executive producer, keyboards, lead vocals
Lenny Zakatek: vocals

References

1984 singles
1980s ballads
The Alan Parsons Project songs
Song recordings with Wall of Sound arrangements
Animated music videos
Arista Records singles
1983 songs
Rock ballads
Songs written by Eric Woolfson
Songs written by Alan Parsons
Song recordings produced by Alan Parsons